Tropicália is a Brazilian art movement.

Tropicalia may also refer to:

Tropicália: A Brazilian Revolution in Sound, a 2006 compilation album
Tropicália: ou Panis et Circencis, a 1968 compilation album
Tropicália 2, an album by Caetano Veloso and Gilberto Gil, 1993
"Tropicalia" (song) by Beck, 1998